Prince Faisal bin Hussein (born 11 October 1963) is a son of King Hussein and Princess Muna, and the younger brother of King Abdullah II. Periodically he has served as regent during his brother's absences abroad.

Education
Faisal was born in Amman, Jordan. After early schooling in Amman, Faisal was sent in 1970 to his mother's native United Kingdom where he attended St. Edmund's School in Hindhead, England. The following year, he moved to the United States where he attended the Bement School in Deerfield, Massachusetts for the next two years. He then moved schools again, this time to Eaglebrook School, also in Deerfield. In 1978, Faisal commenced his high school education at St. Albans School in Washington, D.C., from which he graduated in 1981. His initial university education was at Brown University from which he graduated in 1985 with a ScB degree in electrical engineering. The prince also earned a master's degree in management from the London Business School in 1988. During his university years, Faisal took flying lessons and obtained a private pilot's license.

Military service
Prior to graduating from Brown University, Faisal served in the Royal Jordanian Air Force (RJAF), where he received helicopter training. In the summer of 1985, he gained his RJAF wings and then underwent officer training with the Royal Air Force at Cranwell. Remaining at Cranwell, he did his RAF Basic Flying Training in 1986 before moving to RAF Valley where he completed Advanced Flying Training on jets and received his RAF wings in 1987. Later that year, Feisal completed further flying training at the Tactical Weapons Unit, at Chivenor in Devon. 

In September 2004, Faisal was appointed an assistant to the Chairman of the Joint Chiefs of Staff, with the rank of Lieutenant General. He retired from the Jordan Arab Army in December 2017.

Other
Faisal has been President of the Jordan Olympic Committee since 2003 and Chairman and Founder of Generations For Peace since 2007, a non-profit peace building organization, the brain child of his ex-wife Sarah Kabbani who was also his advisor for many years before their marriage. Following a period of strategic development and implementation of unique peace through sport programs run jointly by Sarah and Faisal, he was elected as a member of the Jordan Olympic Committee in 2010.

From time to time, he has served as regent while his brother the king was out of the country.

Personal life

Prince Faisal has married three times. He married for the first time in August 1987. The bride, Alia Tabbaa is the daughter of Sayyid Tawfik al-Tabbah, founder and president of Royal Jordanian Airlines and his wife, Lamia Addem. They have four children together:
Princess Ayah (11 February 1990)
Prince Omar (22 October 1993)
Princess Sara (27 March 1997) (twin of Aisha)
Princess Aisha (27 March 1997) (twin of Sara)
Prince Faisal and Princess Alia divorced in April 2008.

Prince Faisal's second wife was Sara Bassam Qabbani. They were engaged on 20 March 2010 in Jeddah, Saudi Arabia and were married on 24 May 2010. Prince Faisal and Sara were divorced on 14 September 2013. The couple had no children together.

On 4 January 2014, Prince Faisal married Jordanian radio presenter Zeina Lubbadeh, daughter of businessman Dr. Fares Lubbadeh. The wedding ceremony was held at her parents' home in Amman, Jordan. The couple have two sons:
Prince Abdullah bin Faisal (born 17 February 2015)
Prince Muhammad bin Faisal (born 8 April 2017)

Honours

National honours 
 :
 Knight Grand Cordon of the Supreme Order of the Renaissance, Special Class
 Knight Grand Cordon of the Order of the Star of Jordan
 Knight Grand Cordon of the Order of Independence
 Knight Grand Cordon of the Order of Military Merit
 Recipient of the Al-Hussein Medal of Excellence, 1st Class
 Recipient of the Long Service Medal
 Recipient of the Administrative & Leadership Competence Medal
 Recipient of the Administrative & Technical Competence Medal
 Recipient of the Administrative & Training Competence Medal

Foreign honours 
 :
 Grand Cross of the Order of Bernardo O'Higgins
 :
 Special Grand Cordon of the Order of the Cloud and Banner
 :
 Grand Officer of the Order of the Legion of Honour
 :
 Knight Grand Cross of the Order of Sultan Qaboos
 :
 Knight Grand Cross of the Order of Isabella the Catholic
 :
 Commander of the Legion of Merit

References

External links

|-

1963 births
Living people
Jordanian princes
House of Hashim
Jordanian generals
Brown University alumni
Alumni of London Business School
Royal Jordanian Air Force personnel
Jordanian people of English descent
Air force generals
Graduates of the Royal Air Force College Cranwell
International Olympic Committee members
Grand Cordons of the Order of Independence (Jordan)
Knights Grand Cross of the Order of Isabella the Catholic
St. Albans School (Washington, D.C.) alumni
Sons of kings